Dve Mogili Municipality is a municipality (obshtina) in Ruse Province, Central-North Bulgaria, located in the Danubian Plain, about 15 km southeast of Danube river. It is named after its administrative centre - the town of Dve Mogili.

The area is best known with Orlova Chuka cave. Accidentally discovered in 1941, with its 13,437 m, it is the second-longest in the country.

The main road E85 touches the northwest border of the municipality, connecting the province centre of Ruse with the cities of Veliko Tarnovo and respectively Pleven and Sofia.

Settlements 

Dve Mogili Municipality includes the following 12 places (towns are shown in bold):

Demography 
The following table shows the change of the population during the last four decades.

Religion 
According to the latest Bulgarian census of 2011, the religious composition, among those who answered the optional question on religious identification, was the following:

References

External links
 Official website 

Municipalities in Ruse Province